Dhaka-9 is a constituency represented in the Jatiya Sangsad (National Parliament) of Bangladesh since 2008 by Saber Hossain Chowdhury of the Awami League.

Boundaries 
The constituency encompasses Dhaka South City Corporation wards 1 through 7, and three union parishads of Khilgaon and Sabujbagh thanas: Dakshingaon, Manda, and Nasirabad.

History 
The constituency was created for the first general elections in newly independent Bangladesh, held in 1973.

Ahead of the 2008 general election, the Election Commission redrew constituency boundaries to reflect population changes revealed by the 2001 Bangladesh census. The 2008 redistricting added 7 new seats to the Dhaka metropolitan area, increasing the number of constituencies in the capital from 8 to 15, and altered the boundaries of the constituency.

Members of Parliament

Elections

Elections in the 2010s 
Saber Hossain Chowdhury was re-elected unopposed in the 2014 general election after opposition parties withdrew their candidacies in a boycott of the election.

Elections in the 2000s

Elections in the 1990s 

Khaleda Zia stood for five seats in the 1991 general election: Bogra-7,  Dhaka-5, Dhaka-9, Feni-1, and Chittagong-8. After winning all five, she chose to represent Feni-1 and quit the other four, triggering by-elections in them. J. U. Sirker of the BNP was elected in a September 1991 by-election.

References

External links
 

Parliamentary constituencies in Bangladesh
Dhaka District